This is a list of notable events in country music that took place in the year 1976.

Events
 January 3 — Austin City Limits debuts as a regular series on PBS. For many years, the show is taped at the University of Texas at Austin. Although not exclusively country — styles would range from western swing, Texas blues, Tejano music, progressive country, rock n' roll, jazz, alternative country, alternative rock, folk music and jam band — the show is widely hailed as a showcase of music of diverse styles and would be heavily influential in many country music artists' styles.

No dates
The CB radio craze was sweeping country music, as no less than three No. 1 songs are about citizens-band radios. C. W. McCall's "Convoy" — about a band of truck drivers who fight back against redneck police officers — spends four of its six weeks at No. 1 in January, and goes on to be Billboard's No. 1 country song of 1976. Other top songs where CB radios were central to the plot were:
 "The White Knight" by Cledus Maggard & The Citizen's Band, about a lead-footed truck driver who is led into a speed trap by a corrupt state trooper.
 "Teddy Bear" by Red Sovine, a sentimental recitation about a fatherless, physically handicapped boy who keeps in touch with truck drivers. He states his lone wish is to ride around with his father, but since that can't happen, other truck drivers make good on the wish by showing up at the young lad's home and giving him rides.
Production began on Dolly Parton's syndicated variety show Dolly! Though Parton was said to have been less than pleased with the end result, and the show only lasted for one season, it expanded her audience at a time when she was in the midst of refocusing her career from that of a specifically country performer to an entertainer with broader pop and mainstream appeal.

Top hits of the year

Number one hits

United States
(as certified by Billboard)

Notes
1^ No. 1 song of the year, as determined by Billboard.
A^ First Billboard No. 1 hit for that artist.
B^ Last Billboard No. 1 hit for that artist.
C^ Only Billboard No. 1 hit for that artist to date.

Canada
(as certified by RPM)

Notes
2^ Song dropped from No. 1 and later returned to top spot.
A^ First RPM No. 1 hit for that artist.
B^ Last RPM No. 1 hit for that artist.
C^ Only RPM No. 1 hit for that artist.

Other major hits

Singles released by American artists

Singles released by Canadian artists

Top Albums
{|class="wikitable sortable"
!width="200"|Single
!width="150"|Artist
!width="75"|Record Label
|-
|All I Can Do
|Dolly Parton
|RCA
|-
|Come on Over
|Olivia Newton-John
|MCA
|-
|Crystal
|Crystal Gayle
|United Artists
|-
|Crystal Lady
|Olivia Newton-John
|MCA
|-
|Dave & Sugar
|Dave & Sugar
|RCA
|-
|Don't Stop Believin'
|Olivia Newton-John
|MCA
|-
|Golden Ring
|George Jones and Tammy Wynette
|Epic
|-
|Harmony
|Don Williams
|ABC
|-
|Here's Some Love
|Tanya Tucker
|MCA
|-
|Hotel California
|Eagles
|Asylum
|-
|Lovin' and Learnin'
|Tanya Tucker
|MCA
|-
|One Piece at a Time
|Johnny Cash
|Columbia
|-
|Sometimes
|Bill Anderson and Mary Lou Turner
|MCA
|-
|The Sound in Your Mind
|Willie Nelson
|Columbia
|-
|Their Greatest Hits (1971-1975)
|The Eagles
|Asylum
|-
|The Troublemaker
|Willie Nelson
|Columbia
|-
|Wanted! The Outlaws
||Waylon Jennings, Willie Nelson, Tompall Glaser and Jessi Colter
|RCA
|-
|What I've Got in Mind|Billie Jo Spears
|United Artists
|}

Other new albums

Births
 March 17 — Kiefer Thompson, of Thompson Square.
 June 18 — Blake Shelton, neotraditionalist of the 2000s.
 June 18 — busbee (born Michael Busbee), songwriter and producer of the 2010s. (died 2019)
 July 17 – Luke Bryan, singer-songwriter who rose to fame with songs like "Someone Else Calling You Baby" and "I Don't Want This Night to End".
 October 19 — Cyndi Thomson, female vocalist who enjoyed brief fame in the early 2000s.
 October 30 — Kassidy Osborn, member of SHeDAISY.
 November 26 — Joe Nichols, neotraditionalist of the 2000s.
 December 7 – Sunny Sweeney, female vocalist of the 2010s, with hits like "From a Table Away."

Deaths

Country Music Hall of Fame Inductees
Paul Cohen (1908–1970)
Kitty Wells (1919–2012)

Major awards

Grammy Awards
Best Female Country Vocal Performance — Elite Hotel, Emmylou Harris
Best Male Country Vocal Performance — "(I'm a) Stand by My Woman Man", Ronnie Milsap
Best Country Performance by a Duo or Group with Vocal — "The End is Not in Sight (The Cowboy Tune)", Amazing Rhythm Aces
Best Country Instrumental Performance — Chester and Lester, Chet Atkins and Les Paul
Best Country Song — "Broken Lady", Larry Gatlin (Performer: Larry Gatlin)

Juno Awards
Country Male Vocalist of the Year — Murray McLauchlan
Country Female Vocalist of the Year — Anne Murray
Country Group or Duo of the Year — Mercey Brothers

Academy of Country Music
Entertainer of the Year — Mickey Gilley
Song of the Year — "Don't the Girls All Get Prettier at Closing Time", Baker Knight (Performer: Mickey Gilley)
Single of the Year — "Bring It On Home to Me", Mickey Gilley
Album of the Year — Gilley's Smoking, Mickey Gilley
Top Male Vocalist — Mickey Gilley
Top Female Vocalist — Crystal Gayle
Top Vocal Duo — Conway Twitty and Loretta Lynn
Top New Male Vocalist — Moe Bandy
Top New Female Vocalist — Billie Jo Spears

Country Music Association
Entertainer of the Year — Mel Tillis
Song of the Year — "Rhinestone Cowboy", Larry Weiss (Performer: Glen Campbell)
Single of the Year — "Good Hearted Woman", Waylon Jennings and Willie Nelson
Album of the Year — Wanted! The Outlaws'', Waylon Jennings, Willie Nelson, Tompall Glaser and Jessi Colter
Male Vocalist of the Year — Ronnie Milsap
Female Vocalist of the Year — Dolly Parton
Vocal Duo of the Year — Waylon Jennings and Willie Nelson
Vocal Group of the Year — The Statler Brothers
Instrumentalist of the Year — Hargus "Pig" Robbins
Instrumental Group of the Year — Roy Clark and Buck Trent

Further reading
Kingsbury, Paul, "The Grand Ole Opry: History of Country Music. 70 Years of the Songs, the Stars and the Stories," Villard Books, Random House; Opryland USA, 1995
Kingsbury, Paul, "Vinyl Hayride: Country Music Album Covers 1947–1989," Country Music Foundation, 2003
Millard, Bob, "Country Music: 70 Years of America's Favorite Music," HarperCollins, New York, 1993
Whitburn, Joel, "Top Country Songs 1944–2005 – 6th Edition." 2005.

Other links
Country Music Association
Inductees of the Country Music Hall of Fame

External links
Country Music Hall of Fame

Country
Country music by year